Graphium philonoe, the eastern white-lady swordtail, is a butterfly in the family Papilionidae. It is found in Sudan, Ethiopia, Uganda, Kenya, the Democratic Republic of the Congo, Tanzania, Malawi and Mozambique. Its habitat consists of coastal and riparian forests.

Description
Differs from [related species]] in that the discal spots of cellules 1 a and 1 b of the forewing cover the base of these cellules; the submarginal spots of cellules 4—8 of the fore¬wing are single, rounded and rather large, those of the hindwing on the contrary represented in each cellule by two streaks; the basal spots of cellules 2, 3 and 6 of the hindwing are sharply defined distally, transversely cut off or rounded; the cell of the forewing before the middle with three white dots in a transverse line, then a large transverse spot divided into three parts by the dark folds and finally at the apex two white dots; the discal spots of cellules 2—4 of the forewing are usually rounded and more or less separated. — German and British East Africa.

Biology
Males may infrequently mud-puddle. Both sexes are attracted to flowers, including Maerua species.

The larvae feed on Uvaria leptocladon, Uvaria chamae and Annona species.

Subspecies
Graphium philonoe philonoe (Democratic Republic of the Congo, coast of Kenya, eastern Tanzania, Malawi, Mozambique)
Graphium philonoe whalleyi (Talbot, 1929) (southern Sudan, south-western Ethiopia, northern Uganda, north-western Kenya)

Taxonomy
It is a member of the  tynderaeus -clade (Graphium  tynderaeus, Graphium philonoe, Graphium  latreillianus).In some works it is seen as the sole member of species group philonoe.

References

Carcasson, R.H 1960 The Swallowtail Butterflies of East Africa (Lepidoptera,Papilionidae). Journal of the  East Africa Natural History Society pdf Key to East Africa members of the species group, diagnostic and other notes and figures. (Permission to host granted by The East Africa Natural History Society

philonoe
Butterflies described in 1873
Butterflies of Africa
Taxa named by Christopher Ward (entomologist)